Nandrolone laurate (brand names Clinibolin, Fortadex, Laurabolin), or nandrolone dodecanoate, also known as 19-nortestosterone 17β-laurate, is a synthetic androgen and anabolic steroid and a nandrolone ester. It is used in veterinary medicine in Austria, France, the Netherlands, and Switzerland.

See also
 List of androgen esters § Nandrolone esters

References

External links
 Laurabolin (nandrolone laurate) - William Llewellyn's Anabolic.org 

Androgens and anabolic steroids
Enones
Laurate esters
Nandrolone esters
Progestogens